Kirovograd or Kirovohrad may refer to:
Kropyvnytskyi, a city in Ukraine formerly named Kirovohrad
Kirovohrad Oblast, of which Kropyvnytskyi is the administrative center
Ganja, Azerbaijan, a city in Azerbaijan formerly named Kirovograd
SS Kirovograd, a Soviet cargo ship